Ayherre is a commune in the Pyrénées-Atlantiques department in the Nouvelle-Aquitaine region of south-western France.

The inhabitants of the commune are known as Aihertars.

Geography
Ayherre is located in the Arberoue Valley in the former province of Lower Navarre some 23 km east by south-east of Bayonne and immediately east of Hasparren. Access to the commune is by the D10 road from Hasparren which passes through the west of the commune and continues north to La Bastide-Clairence. The D251 branches east off the D10 in the commune and goes to the village then continues east to Isturits. The D314 goes south-west from the village to Bonloc. The D14 from Bonloc to Saint-Esteben passes through the south of the commune. The commune is mainly farmland with scattered forests.

The commune is located in the drainage basin of the Adour with a dense network of streams covering the commune, mostly flowing north-westwards, and including the Joyeuse, which forms part of the western border of the commune. The Arbéroue rises in the south of the commune and flows north gathering many tributaries before joining the Lihoury to the north.

Places and hamlets

 Abarratia
 Ahounsbiscardeguy
 Aguerréa (3 places)
 Aguerréko Borda
 Ainguéroutéguia
 Andérétéguia
 Apairi or Apahiri, from Apʰara-hiri
 Apézénéa
 Apeztéguia
 Archidukénia
 Arduarria
 Arkhia
 Arramendy
 Arraydua
 Auchotéa
 Ayherregaraya
 Ballade Etcheberry
 Barné Uhartia
 Béhibidia
 Belzunce
 Berhéta
 Berhétako Borda
 Berhoa
 Bicaldéguy
 Bichartéa
 Bidartéa
 Bidegain Etchetoa
 Bidegainia
 Bildaraitz or Bildarraitz
 Bordalanda
 Buztingorria
 Celhaya
 Chapitalborda
 Chapitalia (mill)
 Chedarria
 Chelhaya
 Chocoa
 Courtaut
 Currioléko Borda
 Curutzaldéa
 Egyptoa
 Erketa
 Erregnétéa
 Errékahoua
 Errékartéa
 Espertatea
 Estekatea
 Etchartéa
 Etchébarnéko Borda
 Etchébazterréa
 Etchébéhéréa
 Etchébéhéreko Borda
 Etchéberria (2 places)
 Etcheberriko Borda
 Etchéberstia
 Etchéchouria
 Etchégaraya
 Etchégoïnéa
 Etchénika
 Etchenikako Borda
 Etchéparéa
 Etchétipia
 Etchetoa
 Eyhéra
 Ezpildéa
 Ferminéko Borda
 Fermirénéa
 Gandéramendia
 Gandéramendiko Borda
 Garralda
 Gauhetchia
 Granya
 Granyagaraya
 Haranbilléta
 Haranburua
 Haranéa
 Harréguia
 Harriéta
 Harriétako Borda
 Hastoya
 Hégoa
 Hergaitz
 Hiriartéa
 Ichuria
 Idiartéa
 Idigoïnia
 Ilharindéguia
 Ipoutsaguerria
 Irachiloa
 Irazabalia
 Iriart Urrutia
 Iribarnéa
 Iriberria
 Issouribeherea
 Jauberria (2 places)
 Jaungaztenia
 Jelossia
 Kintalénéa
 Kitendéa
 Larrégaïnia
 Larzabaléa
 Leichorrénéa
 Létouatéguia
 Lohichundéa
 Londaits
 Londaitsbehere
 Londaïtzberria
 Londaitzekoborda
 Lukua
 Lur Berry
 Manéchéka Borda
 Manéchénéa
 Mayartéguia
 Mendia
 Mendiberria
 Mendiburua
 Mendigorria
 Mendilarréa
 Menta
 Mentaberria
 Mentachiloa
 Mignotéguia
 Négutéa
 Notariaénia
 Ourriola
 Oyhana
 Oyharartéa
 Oyharitzéa
 Oyharitséko Borda
 Patindeya
 Peña
 Petchitea
 Pipitea
 Pompochénéa
 Sallaberryborda
 Sarcabaleko Borda
 Sarhigaïnéa
 Tuturrutéguia
 Uhaldéa
 Urgorria
 Urquéta
 Zabaloa
 Zabalza
 Zaliotéguia
 Zokoa

Toponymy
The commune name in basque is Aiherra or Aiherre. According to Jean-Baptiste Orpustan, the name comes from the basque ailherr ("incline"), giving the meaning "place on a slope".

The following table details the origins of the commune name and other names in the commune.

In the Middle Ages Bildarraitz was an independent area without a church but with its own council, and a half-dozen homes were ennobled in 1435. The name may be the joining of bil-, meaning "set" or "a round place", and araitz, meaning "blackthorn", "prickly", or "briar".

Sources:
Orpustan: Jean-Baptiste Orpustan, New Basque Toponymy
Raymond: Topographic Dictionary of the Department of Basses-Pyrenees, 1863, on the page numbers indicated in the table. 
Cassini: Cassini Map from 1750

Origins:

Camara: Titles of Camara of Comptos 
Pamplona: Titles of Pamplona)
Collations: Collations of the Diocese of Bayonne
Biscay: Martin Biscay
Duchesne: Duchesne collection volume CXIV

History
On 18 March 1450, Labourd returned to the French crown after the signing of a peace treaty at the Château of Belzunce in Ayherre which marked the end of English influence in the region. On that the representatives of Labourd made their submission and, upon payment of 2,000 gold écus secured by the retention of 10 hostages, retained their privileges.

Heraldry

Administration

List of successive mayors

Inter-communality
The commune is part of six inter-communal structures:
 the Communauté d'agglomération du Pays Basque
 the AEP association of Arberoue
 the sanitation association of Adour-Ursula
 the energy association of Pyrénées-Atlantiques
 the inter-communal association for the building of a retirement home in the Arberoue Valley
 the inter-communal association for the crafts zone in Ayherre

Demography
The declaration of rights in 1749 counted 162 fires in Ayherre (130 third estate, one priest, two members of the nobility (Arcangues and Belsunce) and 29 non-owners).

In 2017 the commune had 1,042 inhabitants.

Economy

Economic activity in the commune is mainly agricultural. The commune is part of the Appellation d'origine contrôlée (AOC) zone of Ossau-iraty.

The Lauak company (aeronautical and aerospace industry) is located in the industrial zone of Ayherre.

The Uhagun Mill on the Aran dates to the 19th century and has been converted into a hydro-electric plant.

Culture and heritage

Civil heritage
The commune has three sites that are registered as historical monuments:
The Château de Belzunce (13th century)
Prehistoric fortifications on Mount Abarratia
Prehistoric fortifications (Gaztelu Zahar of three levels)

Religious heritage

The Parish Church of Saint Pierre (17th century) is registered as an historical monument.

Education

The commune has two primary schools: one in the town and one private school of the Immaculate Conception.

Notable people linked to the commune
Émile Larre, born in 1926 at Saint-Étienne-de-Baïgorry, was a priest, chronicler, Bertsolari, writer, and French academic in the Basque language. He was an active promoter of basque traditions and particularly attached to the basque modes of expression such as the bertsolarism and Basque Pelota. He was priest of Ayherre from 1969 to 1980.

See also
Communes of the Pyrénées-Atlantiques department

References

External links

Ayherre official website 
Ayherre on the 1750 Cassini map

Communes of Pyrénées-Atlantiques
Lower Navarre